Nancy Fiddler (born February 21, 1956) is an American cross-country skier who competed from 1987 to 1993. Competing in two Winter Olympics, she had her best career finish of eighth in the 4 × 5 km relay at Calgary in 1988 and her best individual finish of 25th in the 5 km event at Albertville in 1992.  Fiddler began skiing at Bates College, in Maine. She won 14 national championships during her career.

Fiddler's best finish at the FIS Nordic World Ski Championships was 15th in the 15 km event at Lahti in 1989. Her best World Cup finish was 15th in a 5 km event in Canada in 1991.

Fiddler's lone individual career victory was in a 5 km FIS race in the United States in 1993.

Cross-country skiing results
All results are sourced from the International Ski Federation (FIS).

Olympic Games

World Championships

World Cup

Season standings

References

External links

Women's 4 x 5 km cross-country relay Olympic results: 1976-2002 

1956 births
American female cross-country skiers
Cross-country skiers at the 1988 Winter Olympics
Cross-country skiers at the 1992 Winter Olympics
Living people
Olympic cross-country skiers of the United States
20th-century American women